Edward Ames Hearne (March 1, 1887 – February 9, 1955) was an American racecar driver from Kansas City, Kansas who was active in the formative years of auto racing.

Biography
He was born on March 1, 1887.

He participated in the inaugural Indianapolis 500. He later was a long-time Duesenberg factory-backed driver. Hearne made 106 AAA Championship Car starts and continued driving until 1927, winning 11 Champ Car races and the 1923 National Championship.

He died on February 9, 1955. He was buried in Greenwood Cemetery in Bolivar, Missouri.

Indianapolis 500 results

External links
 

1887 births
1955 deaths
Champ Car champions
Indianapolis 500 drivers
Sportspeople from Kansas City, Kansas
Racing drivers from Kansas
AAA Championship Car drivers